Neal Ronald Parlane (born 9 August 1978) is a New Zealand cricketer and coach. He played first-class cricket for Northern Districts, Wellington and Auckland, making over 100 first-class appearances in a career which lasted from 1996/97 to 2001/12. He was born in Whangarei. He is the younger brother of Michael Parlane.

Parlane also played for Northland in the Hawke Cup. In 2019 he was appointed coach of Northland.

References

External links
 

1978 births
Living people
Auckland cricketers
New Zealand cricketers
New Zealand cricket coaches
Northern Districts cricketers
Cricketers from Whangārei
Wellington cricketers